Jamie at Home is a British cookery programme presented by Jamie Oliver.  In each episode, Jamie uses a different ingredient which has been grown organically at his home in rural Essex, England.

The show was produced by Fresh One Productions and actually shot at Jamie's home.  The theme song for Jamie at Home is My World by Tim Kay.

The show premiered in the United Kingdom on Channel 4 on 7 August 2007.  The series is also airing on Food Network Canada and began airing in the United States on Food Network on 6 January 2008.  The show began a second run in the United States on the Cooking Channel in 2010.

All recipes can be found in his book Jamie At Home and the series is also available on DVD.

Episodes

United Kingdom

Series 1

Series 2

When released as DVDs in 2008, Series 2 was PARTITIONED into "Series 2: Winter Recipes", including episodes 1 through 6 and episode 8, and "Series 2: Summer Recipes", including episode 7 and episodes 9 through 14.

Canada

Season One

Season Two

References list

External links
Jamie at Home Website (UK)
Jamie at Home Website (CA)
Jamie at Home Website (US)-Food Network
Jamie at Home (US)-Cooking Channel
Home recipes like Jamie Oliver

2007 British television series debuts
2008 British television series endings
British cooking television shows
Channel 4 original programming